Daniel Ridgway Knight (15 March 18399 March 1924) was an American artist born in Chambersburg, Pennsylvania.

Biography

Knight was a pupil at the École des Beaux-Arts, Paris, under Gleyre, and later worked in the private studio of Meissonier. After 1872 he lived in France, having a house and studio at Poissy on the Seine.

He painted peasant women out of doors with great popular success. He earned his first major distinction in France at the Paris Salon in 1882 with his large oil on canvas Un Deuil. He would go on to be awarded the silver medal and Cross of the Legion of Honor, Exposition Universelle, Paris, 1889, and was made a Knight of the Royal Order of St. Michael of Bavaria, Munich, 1893, and receiving the gold medal of honor from the Pennsylvania Academy of the Fine Arts, Philadelphia, 1893.

He died in Paris. His son, Louis Aston Knight (1873–1948), was also known as a landscape painter.

The catalogue raisonné research on Daniel Ridgway Knight's life and work is being conducted by Rehs Galleries, Inc., New York City.

Gallery

Notes

References
 The Daily Record, Waynesboro, Pennsylvania, Jan. 11, 1910

External links 
'Wow Factor' Lures Immediate Buyer Of 19th Century French Painting That's Been Unseen For 118 Years
87 works by Daniel Ridgway Knight
Ridgway Knight exhibit Works from the 1880s & 1890s
Ridgway Knight exhibit titled His Years at Rolleboise

1839 births
1924 deaths
19th-century American painters
American male painters
20th-century American painters
American alumni of the École des Beaux-Arts
19th-century American male artists
20th-century American male artists